Charadraula is a moth genus in the family Autostichidae.

Species
 Charadraula cassandra Gozmány, 1967
 Charadraula parcella (Lederer, 1855)

Former species
 Charadraula geminellus (Chrétien, 1915)

References

Holcopogoninae